Grigory Olegovich Kenkishvili (born 18 May 1980) is a former Russian professional association football player.

Club career
He made his Russian Football National League debut for FC Volgar-Gazprom Astrakhan on 29 March 2003 in a game against FC SKA-Energiya Khabarovsk. He played 6 seasons in the FNL for Volgar, SKA-Energiya and FC Baltika Kaliningrad.

External links
 

1980 births
Sportspeople from Vladikavkaz
Living people
Russian footballers
Association football defenders
FC SKA Rostov-on-Don players
FC Baltika Kaliningrad players
FC Chernomorets Novorossiysk players
FC Volgar Astrakhan players
FC Salyut Belgorod players
FC Armavir players
FC Rostov players